was a seaplane tender in the Imperial Japanese Navy (IJN). The ship was initially built at Kawasaki's Kōbe Shipyard and launched on 13 December 1936 as a merchant vessel for the Kawasaki Kisen K. K. Line. On 18 September 1937 the IJN requisitioned her as an aircraft transport ship and she was refitted in 1939 as a seaplane tender. The ship subsequently saw service in the Second Sino-Japanese War and the Pacific Campaign of World War II.

References
 
 
 

1936 ships
Ships sunk by American submarines
Kamikawa Maru-class seaplane tenders
Ships of the Kawasaki Kisen
Ships built by Kawasaki Heavy Industries